Tajamul Husain (19 December 1893 – 11 November 1974) was an Indian politician, Member of the Constituent Assembly and two times member of Rajya Sabha (the upper house of the Parliament of India) from 1952 to 1956 and from 1956 to 1962. In 1948, he was member of the Indian delegation to the Inter-Parliamentary Conference.

Early life and background 
Husain was born on 19 December 1893. He did his education from King's college school, Wimbledon and Queens' College, Cambridge. He was a barrister by profession and studied law at Inner Temple, London in 1920.

Political career 
In 1921, Tajamul Husain joined Congress. He was a member of Bihar Legislative Assembly from 1937 to 1950, Member of Constituent Assembly from 1946 to 1950, Member of Provisional Parliament 1950 to 1952 and Member of Rajya Sabha (the upper house of the Parliament of India) from 1952 to 1956 and from 1956 to 1962.

Positions held

References 

1893 births
1974 deaths
Indian National Congress politicians
Indian politicians
Bihar Legislative Assembly